Events from the year 1819 in Denmark.

Incumbents
 Monarch – Frederick VI

Events

September

 5 September - Hans Christian Andersen arrives in Copenhagen for the first time.
 September – Antisemitic riots in Copenhagen.

Undated

 Denmark's first steamship, SS Caledoniam, a paddle steamer bought used in England, begins operations as a mail steamer between Copenhagen and Kiel.
 Several Anti-semitic riots occur in Copenhagen.

Sports
 10 June  Fremad Amager is founded.

Births
 30 March – Vilhelm Kyhn, painter and educator (died 1903)
 20 May – Pietro Boyesen, photographer (died 1882)
 12 June  Niels Frederik Ravn, politician (born 1826)
 5 September – Peter Schram, opera singer and actor (died 1895)
 4 November – Kristian Mantzius, actor (died 1879)

Deaths
 20 March – Mette Marie Rose, stage actor (born 1745)
 15 May – Arnoldus von Falkenskiold, colonel (born 1743)

References

 
1810s in Denmark
Denmark
Years of the 19th century in Denmark